Kenyarctia melanogastra is a moth in the family Erebidae. It was described by William J. Holland in 1897. It is found in Ethiopia and Somalia.

References

Natural History Museum Lepidoptera generic names catalog

Moths described in 1897
Spilosomina